The International Language Academy of Canada (ILAC) is a private English language school that offers short and long-term English language courses for international students. ILAC currently operates campuses in downtown Toronto, Ontario and Vancouver, British Columbia in Canada.

With over 10,000 students a year from 75+ different countries, ILAC has a network of more than 1,000 international partners around the globe.

The school offers a variety of programs and services that include: General English, Business English, Exam Preparation (IELTS, TOEFL, Cambridge FCE & CAE), College and University Pathway, Youth Path for Teenagers, Night School, GAP Year, Accommodations and Activities.

The International Language Academy of Canada also provides University and College placement services and post-secondary counseling. Their University Pathway course is recognized by more than 70 Canadian Universities and Colleges.

History 

ILAC was founded by Jonathan Kolber, Ilan Cohen and Bernardo Riveros in 1997.

Student Nationalities 

Every year ILAC welcomes thousands of students from over 75 countries. While enrolment numbers are continually changing, the International Language Academy of Canada generally maintains the following ratio of students:

 1/3 from Asia
 1/3 from Latin America
 1/3 from Europe and the Middle East

References

Language schools in Canada
Schools of English as a second or foreign language